Stizocera evanescens is a species of beetle in the family Cerambycidae. It was described by Vitali in 2010.

References

E
Beetles of North America
Burdigalian life
Neogene Dominican Republic
Miocene insects of North America
Prehistoric insects of the Caribbean
Fauna of Hispaniola
Insects of the Dominican Republic
Fossils of the Dominican Republic
Dominican amber
Beetles described in 2010